Coleophora crassa is a moth of the family Coleophoridae.

The larvae feed on Climacoptera crassa. They feed on the generative organs of their host plant.

References

crassa
Moths described in 1989